William Thomas Glasheen was an Australian politician. He was a member of the Western Australian Legislative Council representing the South-East Province from his election on 18 July 1925 until his retirement in 1932. Glasheen was a member of the Country Party.

References 

Members of the Western Australian Legislative Council
20th-century Australian politicians